This is a complete listing of National Basketball Association players who have recorded nine or more steals in a game.

52 players have recorded nine or more steals in a game. It has occurred 72 times in NBA history.

Allen Iverson is the only player to record nine or more steals in a playoff game.

The NBA did not record steals until the 1973–74 season.

See also
NBA regular season records
List of NCAA Division I men's basketball players with 11 or more steals in a game

Notes

References
General
Sporting News, The (2005).  2005–06 Official NBA Guide.

Specific

Steals